Alphabet City may refer to:
Alphabet City, Manhattan, a neighborhood in New York City
Alphabet City (album), a 1987 album by the band ABC
Alphabet City (film), a 1984 crime drama film directed by Amos Poe